Neocallimastix is a genus of obligately anaerobic rumen fungi in the family Neocallimastigaceae. A specialised group of chytrids grow in the rumen of herbivorous animals, where they degrade cellulose and thus play a primary role in the complex microbial ecology of the rumen.

References

External links

Neocallimastigomycota
Fungus genera